Silvio Peter Augustinus Erkens (born 7 August 1990) is a Dutch politician, who has held a seat in the House of Representatives since the 2021 general election. He is a member of the conservative-liberal People's Party for Freedom and Democracy (VVD). He previously worked as a consultant.

Early life and career 
Erkens was born in 1990 in the Limburg city Heerlen and grew up in nearby Kerkrade as an only child. Both of his parents worked for Statistics Netherlands. Erkens played water polo in his youth and received his  diploma from the Kerkrade secondary school Rolduc College. He studied political science at Radboud University Nijmegen starting in 2009 and graduated in 2012 with a Bachelor of Science. While a student, he served as vice-chair of the Nijmegen chapter of the Youth Organisation Freedom and Democracy, the VVD's independent youth wing. Erkens subsequently studied international relations (MSc) for one year at the London School of Economics.

He worked for Boston Consulting Group in the years 2013–16, initially as a junior consultant and later as a senior consultant. Erkens then studied at Columbia Business School, located in New York City, and during his studies also worked for a few months for the executive office of the Secretary-General of the United Nations. He returned to Boston Consulting Group in 2018 as a project manager after obtaining an MBA. Erkens left that company in 2020.

Politics 
Erkens joined the VVD while a student. He was campaign manager of the Limburg VVD during the 2019 provincial elections, and he was among the writers of the party's election program for Limburg. Erkens also appeared 19th on the VVD's party list but was not elected to the States of Limburg due to his party receiving five seats.

Erkens was the VVD's 18th candidate in the 2021 general election and helped write the election program. He was elected with 4,043 preference votes and was sworn in to the House of Representatives on 31 March. His specializations are climate, energy policy, and the Dutch Emissions Authority. In the House, Erkens said that Tata Steel's blast furnace in IJmuiden should become more sustainable. He argued for financially assisting the company and for partially nationalizing it if absolutely necessary. He has also been an advocate of nuclear power to mitigate climate change. In 2021, a motion by Erkens and Renske Leijten (SP) was adopted to investigate distance norms for new wind turbines to prevent nuisance to residents, and he supported a halt on their construction in the meantime.

While global energy prices were steeply increasing, Erkens and Henri Bontenbal (CDA) proposed five measures to relieve consumers to Minister for Climate and Energy Policy Rob Jetten in October 2022. Their recommendations included mandating energy suppliers to offer fixed contracts, forbidding them to give discounts to new customers, and subjecting them to a yearly stress test as well as strengthening consumer protections in case of bankruptcy. The VVD and CDA had liberalized the energy market as part of the second Balkenende cabinet. At the same time, the Netherlands tried to lower its reliance on Russian gas due to its invasion of Ukraine in 2022. To increase energy independence, Erkens presented a bill in February 2023 to extract more gas domestically from the North Sea even if it would be more expensive than importing.

Committee assignments 
 Committee for Agriculture, Nature and Food Quality
 Contact group Belgium
 Contact group Germany
 Contact group United Kingdom
 Committee for Economic Affairs and Climate Policy
 Committee for Infrastructure and Water Management
 Public Expenditure committee

Personal life 
He lives in Kerkrade and has been married to his wife Samita, who is part of an Indian family residing in Switzerland, since 2020. They met each other in New York City and have a daughter. Erkens is a kickboxer.

References

External links 
 Personal website 

1990 births
21st-century Dutch politicians
Columbia Business School alumni
Dutch management consultants
Living people
Alumni of the London School of Economics
Members of the House of Representatives (Netherlands)
People from Kerkrade
Radboud University Nijmegen alumni
People's Party for Freedom and Democracy politicians